The men's 800 metres event at the 2009 Asian Athletics Championships was held at the Guangdong Olympic Stadium on November 12–13.

Medalists

Results

Heats

Final

References
Results

2009 Asian Athletics Championships
800 metres at the Asian Athletics Championships